Yusuf Ekodono  (born 16 April 1967) is an Indonesian former footballer and manager/coach who previously work as a manager for Persebaya DU (Bhayangkara) in 2011-12 Liga Indonesia Premier Division (LI).

He is the father of Fandi Eko Utomo and Wahyu Suboseto.

International career

International goals

Hounors

Clubs
Liga Indonesia Premier Division champions (1) : 1996–97

References

1967 births
Living people
Indonesian footballers
Indonesia international footballers
Association football midfielders
Perserikatan players
Indonesian Premier Division players
Persebaya Surabaya players
PSIS Semarang players
Southeast Asian Games gold medalists for Indonesia
Southeast Asian Games medalists in football
Competitors at the 1991 Southeast Asian Games
Sportspeople from Surabaya